Satpura Thermal Power Station is located at Sarni in Betul district of Madhya Pradesh, India. The power plant is one of the Coal-fired power station of MPPGCL

Power plant
Satpura Thermal Power Station has eleven Units, five has been decommissioned and dismantled, four are non-operational while the rest two are operational. The Dam was built for the purpose of power generation.

Installed capacity
Satpura Thermal Power Station was the largest power plant of MPPGCL till 2007 with an installed capacity of 1142.5 Megawatt. From year 2019 onwards it is the third largest power plant of MPPGCL. From year 2014 onwards with the commissioning of 2 units of 250 MW each and decommissioning of 5 units of 62.5 MW each, the installed capacity of Satpura Thermal Power Station is 1330 MW.

In 2007 with the commissioning of a 500 MW unit at Sanjay Gandhi Thermal Power Station the Satpura Thermal Power Station turned second largest power plant with the largest being Sanjay Gandhi Thermal Power Station which has an installed capacity of 1340 MW.

In year 2018 a unit of 660 MW capacity was commissioned at Shree Singaji Thermal Power Project, it raised the installed capacity from 1200 MW to 1860 MW making it the largest power station of MPPGCL. In 2019 a unit of 660 MW was commissioned, it further raised the installed capacity to 2520 MW.

See also 

 Sanjay Gandhi Thermal Power Station
 Amarkantak Thermal Power Station
 Shree Singaji Thermal Power Project
 Madhya Pradesh Power Generation Company Limited

References 

Coal-fired power stations in Madhya Pradesh
Betul district
Energy infrastructure completed in 1967
1967 establishments in Madhya Pradesh
20th-century architecture in India